Cannon in comics may refer to:

 Cannon (WildStorm Productions)
Heroes, Inc. Presents Cannon, a Wally Wood comic

See also
 Cannonball (comics)